The Three Faces is a 1965 Italian comedy film consisting of segments directed by Michelangelo Antonioni, Mauro Bolognini, and Franco Indovina.

Cast
"Il provino"
 Soraya as Herself
 Ivano Davoli as Davoli - Journalist
 Alfredo De Laurentiis as Himself
 Dino De Laurentiis as Himself
 Piero Tosi as Costumista
 Giorgio Sartarelli as Fotografo
 Ralph Serpe as Produttore

"Gli amanti celebri"
 Soraya as Linda
 Richard Harris as Robert
 Jean Rougeul as Speaker
 Esmeralda Ruspoli as Edda
 José Luis de Vilallonga as Rodolph

"Latin Lover"
 Soraya as Mrs Melville
 Alberto Sordi as Armando Tucci
 Nando Angelini as Fernando Angeli
 Goffredo Alessandrini as Direttore dell'agenzia
 Alberto Giubilo as 2nd journalist in Fiumicino
 Renato Tagliani

External links
 
 Critic of the movie by David Cairns at mubi.com

1965 films
1960s Italian-language films
1965 comedy films
Italian comedy films
Films scored by Piero Piccioni
Films with screenplays by Clive Exton
1960s Italian films